Sir (George) Edgar Vaughan  (24 February 1907 – 25 January 1994) was a British diplomat.

Vaughan was educated at Cheltenham Grammar School and then at Jesus College, Oxford, where he obtained first-class degrees in Modern History (1928) and in PPE (1929).  He was a Laming Travelling Fellow of The Queen's College, Oxford, from 1929 to 1931.  He joined His Majesty's Diplomatic Service in 1930, serving as Vice-Consul in Hamburg, La Paz, Barcelona and Buenos Aires.  After posting in Monrovia (as Chargé d'affaires), Seattle, Washington, Lourenço Marques and Amsterdam (as Consul-General in each), he returned to Buenos Aires as Minister and Consul-General in 1956, before being appointed Ambassador to Panama in 1960.

In 1964 he became Ambassador to Colombia, serving until 1966. He was appointed OBE in 1937, advanced to CBE in 1956 and knighted KBE in 1963.  After leaving the Diplomatic Service, he was a Special Lecturer (1966–1967) then Professor of History (1967–1974) at the University of Saskatchewan, Regina Campus.  He was appointed as a Fellow of the Royal Historical Society in 1965 and as an Honorary Fellow of Jesus College in 1966.  He was awarded the Order of Andrés Bello, First Class, by the government of Venezuela in 1990.  He died on 25 January 1994.

References

1907 births
1994 deaths
People educated at Pate's Grammar School
Alumni of Jesus College, Oxford
Ambassadors of the United Kingdom to Colombia
Ambassadors of the United Kingdom to Panama
Academic staff of the University of Regina
Knights Commander of the Order of the British Empire
Fellows of the Royal Historical Society